Moskva is the name of several ships.

Warships
   –  a ship of the line in service from 1799 until 1830
  – a planned  scrapped prior to launch
  (1965–1996) – the lead ship of

Civilian ships
 , a Soviet diesel-electric  in service in 1960–1992
 , a Russian Project 21900 icebreaker in service since 2008
 Moskva (passenger ship), several with incremental numbering "Mockba-#" to "Mockba-###"  
 , a 2012 passenger ship 
 , a cargo ship 
 , a 1978 cargo ship, later renamed Omskiy 103 
 , a crude oil tanker, later renamed Vladimir Vinogradov

See also
 , a tanker
 Moskva class, several ship classes
 Moskva (disambiguation)

References

Ship names